Eduardo Luís Vieira Ferraz, known as Luís Ferraz (born 1 April 1987) is a Portuguese football player who plays for Merelinense.

Club career
He made his professional debut in the Segunda Liga for Vizela on 6 August 2016 in a game against Académico de Viseu.

References

1987 births
Sportspeople from Braga
Living people
Portuguese footballers
Merelinense F.C. players
F.C. Vizela players
Liga Portugal 2 players
Association football midfielders